Kesang  is a mukim in Tangkak District, Johor, Malaysia.

Geography
Kesang spreads across 38 km2 of land with a population of 10,598 people.

Towns
 Parit Bunga

References

Mukims of Johor
Towns, suburbs and villages in Tangkak